Cobalt(III) nitrate is an inorganic compound with the chemical formula Co(NO3)3. It is a green, diamagnetic solid that sublimes at ambient temperature.

Structure
The compound is a molecular coordination complex.  The three bidentate nitrate ligands give a distorted octahedral arrangement.  The nitrate ligands are planar.  With D3 symmetry, the molecule is  chiral.  The Co-O bond lengths are about 190 pm long.  The O-Co-O angles for the two oxygens in the same nitrate is about 68 degrees.  The same geometry seems to persist in carbon tetrachloride solution.

Preparation and reactions 
Cobalt(III) nitrate can be prepared by the reaction of dinitrogen pentoxide  with cobalt(III) fluoride  .   It can be purified by vacuum sublimation at 40 °C.

Cobalt(III) nitrate oxidizes water, the initial green solution rapidly turns pink, with formation of cobalt(II) ions and release of oxygen. Cobalt(III) nitrate can be intercalated in graphite, in the ratio of 1 molecule for each 12 carbon atoms.

See also
 Cobalt(III) fluoride
 Cobalt(III) chloride
 Cobalt(III) hydroxide
 Iron(III) nitrate
 Iron(III) oxalate

References

Cobalt(III) compounds
Nitrates